The Roanoke International Tennis Tournament was a men's tennis tournament played on indoor carpet courts at the Roanoke Civic Center in Roanoke, Virginia in the United States. The event was part of the USLTA Indoor Circuit and was held from 1972 until 1975. Jimmy Connors won three of the four editions.

Past finals

Singles

Doubles

External links 
 ATP Vault

Defunct tennis tournaments in the United States
Tennis in Virginia
Roanoke
Recurring sporting events established in 1972
Recurring sporting events disestablished in 1975
1972 establishments in Virginia
1975 disestablishments in Virginia